Air Academy Federal Credit Union is a credit union in Colorado, United States. AAFCU provides comprehensive financial products and services, and online financial management systems. AAFCU has eight branch locations. It has over $800 million US in assets and over 49,000 members worldwide.

In 2017, it dropped National Football League player Brandon Marshall, linebacker for the Denver Broncos, as a spokesperson because he kneeled during the playing of the national anthem on September 25, 2017.

History

Chartered in October 1955, Air Academy Federal Credit Union (AAFCU) was originally created to serve the cadets, officers, and civilians of the newly established United States Air Force Academy at Lowry Air Force Base. As the Air Force Academy grew and evolved, so did its membership.  Today, they not only serve all active and retired military service members and their families, but they also serve employees, students and families of 10 school districts and hundreds of local businesses (also called select employee groups (SEGs)) and their family members. 

AAFCU is a federally chartered, not-for-profit, and member-owned financial institution. AAFCU is regulated by the National Credit Union Administration, a federal agency. Deposits at AAFCU are insured to at least $250,000 per account and are backed by the full faith and credit of the United States Government.

Field of membership

In addition to serving all active and retired United States military members, AAFCU's field of membership includes the employees, students, and families in the following school districts:
 
Academy School District 20
Cheyenne Mountain School District 12
Colorado Springs School District 11
Douglas County School District RE-1
Elbert School District 200
Elizabeth School District C-1
Fountain-Ft. Carson School District 8
Kiowa School District C-2
Lewis-Palmer School District 38
School District 49

AAFCU also serves hundreds of select employee groups and local businesses in the state of Colorado.

External links
 
 About AAFCU
 AAFCU Hours and Locations
 NCUA Call Report

AAFCU Gives Back to the Community through Payback Piggy Program

References

Companies based in Colorado